Jacqueline Burns (born 6 March 1997) is a Northern Irish footballer who plays as a goalkeeper for Reading in the Women's Super League. She previously played in the United States for the Carson–Newman University's women's soccer team and spent part of the 2019 season in Iceland with ÍBV. She has appeared for the Northern Ireland women's national team.

Career

Club
On 24 August 2020, Glentoran announced the signing of Burns.

On 11 March 2022, BK Häcken announced the signing of Burns on a contract until the end of the 2023 season. On 24 June 2022, Häcken announced that Burns had left the club by mutual consent.

On 5 August 2022, Reading announced the double signing of Burns.

International
Burns has been capped for the Northern Ireland national team, appearing for the team during the 2019 FIFA Women's World Cup qualifying cycle. According to the Irish Football Association, Burns made her senior debut on 3 July 2013, in a 3–0 defeat by the Netherlands.

Career statistics

References

External links
 
 
 
 

1997 births
Living people
Women's association footballers from Northern Ireland
Northern Ireland women's international footballers
Women's association football goalkeepers
College women's soccer players in the United States
Expatriate association footballers from Northern Ireland
Expatriate sportspeople from Northern Ireland in the United States
Expatriate women's soccer players in the United States
People from Cookstown
Sportspeople from County Tyrone
Women's Premiership (Northern Ireland) players
Expatriate women's footballers in Iceland
Expatriate sportspeople from Northern Ireland in Iceland
Glentoran W.F.C. players
UEFA Women's Euro 2022 players